John Gordon Young (19 February 1901 – 20 March 1949) was a New Zealand cricketer who played first-class cricket for Canterbury from 1922 to 1924.

A batsman, Young made his highest first-class score in his first match, when he scored 35 opening in the second innings against Auckland in 1921–22. In a non-first-class match for Canterbury B against Hawke's Bay in January 1920 he scored 238 not out in about 280 minutes. He was later an umpire, standing in three first-class matches in the 1930s and 1940s.

He and his wife Violet had one son. Jack died in March 1949.

References

External links
 

1901 births
1949 deaths
New Zealand cricketers
Cricketers from Christchurch
Canterbury cricketers
New Zealand cricket umpires